Como te ves me vi is a 2017 Mexican drama film directed by Germán Quintero. The film is based on the 2001 book entitled Como te ves, me vi: una historia que podría ser la tuya of Quintero. The plot revolves around a teenager misunderstood by his parents and confused in the love he learns to make decisions while living to the limit. The film premiered on 17 February 2017 in Mexico, and is stars Solkin Ruz, Cristina Rodlo, Rocío Verdejo, and Juan Ríos.

Cast 
 Solkin Ruz as Beto
 Cristina Rodlo as Karla Quiñones
 Rocío Verdejo as Diana Quiñones
 Juan Ríos as Gerardo Quiñones
 Carlos Aragón as Artemio
 Juan Pablo Blanco as Lázaro
 Mauro Sánchez Navarro as Marco
 Karen Sandoval as Miriam
 Gustavo Sánchez Parra as Humberto

References

External links 
 

Mexican drama films
2017 drama films
2010s Mexican films
2010s Spanish-language films